Frilford is a hamlet and civil parish about  west of Abingdon, at the junction of the A415 and A338 roads. It lies in the traditional county of Berkshire, but since 1974 has been administered as part of Oxfordshire.

Archaeology
The parish of Frilford has two significant archaeological sites: a Roman villa, and a cemetery on Frilford Heath that appears to include both Roman and Saxon burials. A further complex of remains, including a Roman shrine and amphitheatre, is often referred to as being in Frilford but lies to the south of the village, just inside the boundary of Marcham parish.

Churches
Frilford is part of the Church of England parish of Marcham. It has no Church of England parish church of its own, but a Congregational chapel was built at Frilford in 1841.

Amenities
Frilford Heath Golf Club is to the east of the village. Abingdon Preparatory School at Frilford, formerly Joscas, is a preparatory school.

Transport
Three Stagecoach in Oxfordshire bus routes serve Frilford. Route 15 to Witney and Abingdon. Routes S8 (via Abingdon) and S9 (via Cumnor) to Wantage and Oxford.

People
Notable people from Frilford include Dr Gary Botting, born at Oakley House Maternity Hospital on 19 July 1943, who became a noted Canadian extradition lawyer.

References

Sources & further reading
Akerman, 1865. Report on excavations in an ancient cemetery at Frilford. Proceedings of the Society of Antiquaries of London, 3, 136–41
 
Haverfield, F. 1897. A Roman villa at Frilford. Archaeological Journal, 54, 340–54

Rolleston, G. 1869. Researches and excavations at an ancient cemetery at Frilford. Archaeologia, 42, 417-85 
Rolleston, G. 1880. Further researches in an Anglo-Saxon cemetery at Frilford. Archaeologia, 45, 405-10

External links

Royal Berkshire History website
Oxford University School of Archaeology website

Villages in Oxfordshire
Roman sites in England
Archaeological sites in Oxfordshire
Civil parishes in Oxfordshire